Sri Lanka is a tropical island situated close to the southern tip of India. The invertebrate fauna is as large as it is common to other regions of the world. There are about 2 million species of arthropods found in the world, and still is counting.

The following list is about Orthopterans recorded in Sri Lanka.

Orthopterans
Phylum: Arthropoda
Class: Insecta
Order: Orthoptera

The Orthoptera order of insects includes the grasshoppers, crickets, cave crickets, Jerusalem crickets, katydids, wētā, lubber, Acrida, and locusts. 
More than 27,000 species are distributed worldwide. Many insects in this order have  paurometabolous or incomplete metamorphosis, and produce sound (known as a "stridulation") by rubbing their wings against each other or their legs, the wings or legs containing rows of corrugated bumps. The tympanum or ear is located in the front tibia in crickets, mole crickets, and katydids, and on the first abdominal segment in the grasshoppers and locusts. These organisms use vibrations to locate other individuals. There are two suborders and 235 subfamilies are in this order.

The following list provide the orthopterans currently identified in Sri Lanka. One of Sri Lanka's leading naturalist and expert on orthopterans, George Morrison Reid Henry, who was born in Sri Lanka, was appointed as Assistant in Systematic Entomology at Colombo National Museum from 1913-1946. He started much work on many micro arthropods including orthoptera as well. But the most comprehensive work confined to orthoptera was done by G. M. Henry, though no single monograph of Sri Lankan species is available. The world catalogues of Otte provide up-dated nomenclature and classification. In 2020, a new pygmy grasshopper was discovered from Sinharaja rainforest.

According to Sandrasagara, (1949 to 1954); and Chopard, (1936), 350 species of orthopterans identified from Sri Lanka.

Endemic species are denoted as E.

Family: Tridactylidae - Pygmy mole crickets
 Tridactylus variegatus
 Tridactylus nigroaenus
 Tridactylus curlus
 Tridactylus quadrimaculata
 Tridactylus thoracicus
 Tridactylus ceylonicus
 Xya frontomaculatus
 Xya nigripennis
 Xya opaca
 Xya riparia

Family: Acrididae

Sub family: Gomphocerinae - Slant-faced grasshoppers
 Dnopherula sp.

Sub family: Acridinae - Silent slant-faced grasshoppers
 Acrida exaltata

Sub family: Oedipodinae - Band-winged grasshoppers
 Aiolopus thalassinus
 Gastrimargus africanus

Sub family: Hemiacridinae 
 Spathosternum prasiniferum

Sub family: Cyrtacanthacridinae - Bird grasshoppers
 Cyrtacanthacris tatarica

Sub family: Eyprepocnemidinae 
 Cyrtacanthacris tatarica

Sub family: Catantopinae - Spur-throated grasshoppers
 Xenocatantops humilis
 Catantops pinguis

Family: Chorotypidae 
 Orchetypus ceylonicus

Family: Gryllacrididae - Leaf-rolling crickets
 Brachyntheisogryllacris punicea
Diaphanogryllacris aequalis 
 Neanias squamatus
 Pardogryllacris pardalina
 Pardogryllacris spuria

Family: Gryllidae - Crickets

Sub family:Gryllinae - Field crickets
 Brachytrypes orientalis
 Gymnogryllus erythrocephalus
 Phonarellus humeralis
 Itaropsis tenellus
 Gryllus bimaculatus
 Gryllulus testaceus
 Gryllulus mitratus
 Gryllulus configuratus
 Gryllulus flavus
 Gryllulus confirmatus
 Gryllulus bucharicus
 Gryllulus brevicauda
 Gryllulus blennus
 Gryllulus pallipes
 Gryllodes sigillatus
 Gryllodes supplicans
 Gryllopsis falconneti
 Nemobiodes laeviceps
 Nemobiodes nigrocephalus
 Cophogryllus martini
 Scapsipedus aspersus
 Scapsipedus ceylonicus
 Coiblemmus compactus
 Loxoblemmus equestris
 Loxoblemmus longipalpis
 Staphoblemmus humbertiellus
 Scapsipedoides macrocephalus
 Scapsipedoides apterus
 Teleogryllus mitratus
 Teratodes monticollis
 Landreva clara
 Landreva subaptera
 Jareta insignis
 Landreva angustifrons
 Hemilandreva lamellipennis

Sub family:Nemobiinae - Ground crickets

 Paranemobius pictus
 Ptreonemobius concolor
 Ptreonemobius birmanus
 Ptreonemobius vagus
 Ptreonemobius taprobanensis
 Ptreonemobius fascipes
 Ptreonemobius csikii
 Ptreonemobius bicolor
 Scottia ceylonica
 Polionemobius taprobanensis
 Neanias squamatus

Sub family:Trigoniinae

 Trigonidium cicindeloides
 Trigonidium humbertianum
 Metioche unicolor
 Metiochodes greeni
 Metiochodes trilineatus
 Amusurgus oedemeroides
 Amusurgus speculifer
 Paranaxipha ornatipes
 Trigonidomorpha fuscifrons
 Homoeoxipha lycoides
 Anaxipha pubescens
 Anaxipha longipennis
 Anaxipha henryi

Sub family:Myrmecophilinae - Ant crickets

 Myrmecophila escherichi
 Myrmecophilellus pilipes

Sub family:Pentacentrinae - Anomalous crickets

 Pentacentrus pulchellus
 Homologryllus depressus

Sub family:Oecanthinae - Tree crickets

 Oecanthus indicus
 Oecanthus rufescens
 Oecanthus henryi

Sub family:Itarinae

 Heterotrypus vicinus
 Heterotrypus elegans

Sub family:Eneopterinae - Bush crickets

 Cardiodactylus praecipuus

Sub family:Podoscirtinae

 Madasumma marginipennis
 Madasumma greeni
 Madasumma albonotata
 Madasumma valida
 Madasumma varipennis
 Mnesibulus pallipes
 Euscyrtus hemelytrus
 Euscyrtus concinnus
 Euscyrtus necydaloides
 Euscyrtus laminifer
 Euscyrtus perforatus
 Patiscus quadripunctatus

Family:Gryllotalpidae - Mole crickets
 Gryllotalpa africana

Family:Mogoplistidae - Scaly crickets
 Cycloptiloides orientalis
 Ornebius guerini
 Ornebius varipennis
 Derectaotus ceylonicus
 Derectaotus henryi
 Derectaotus palpatus
 Ectotoderus ceylonicus

Family:Myrmecophilidae - Ant-loving crickets
 Myrmecophilellus pilipes
 Myrmecophilus escherichi

Family:Tetrigidae - Pygmy locusts
Andriana hancocki
Apterotettix obtusus
Cingalotettix pterugodes
Cladonotus bhaskari
Coptotettix conspersus
Coptotettix fossulatus
Coptotettix rugosus
Coptotettix testaceus
Criotettix miliarius
Deltonotus subcucullatus
Ergatettix dorsifera
Eucriotettix tricarinatus
Euparatettix parvus
Euparatettix variabilis
Gavialidium crocodilum
Hedotettix attenuatus
Hedotettix festivus
Hedotettix gracilis
Loxilobus acutus
Loxilobus novaebrittanniae
Paratettix cingalensis
Paratettix variegatus
Spadotettix fletcheri
Systoloderus greeni
Tettilobus pelops
Tetrix abortus
Tettix atypicalis
Tetrix discalis
Xistrells stylsts

Sub family:Scelimeninae

Criotettix curticornis  
Criotettix miliarius 
Criotettix subulatus 
Eucriotettix tricarinatus 
Eucriotettix spinilobus 
Euscelimena gavialis 
Euscelimena logani 
Loxilobus acutus 
Loxilobus acutus acutus 
Euscelimena logani

Family:Phalangopsidae

Sub family:Phalangopsinae - Spider crickets

Arachnomimus annulicornis
Arachnomimus bicolor
Arachnomimus brevipalpis
Arachnomimus nietneri
Luzaropsis confusa
Luzaropsis ferruginea
Luzaropsis henryi
Luzaropsis omissa
Paragryllodes ceylonicus
Paragryllodes gravelyi
 Seychellsia ceylonica

Family:Podoscirtidae
Ceyloria latissima
Ceyloria vicina
Euscyrtus concinnus
Euscyrtus hemelytrus
Euscyrtus laminifer
Euscyrtus necydaloides
Euscyrtus nigrifrons
Heterotrypus elegans
Homologryllus depressus
Madasumma albonotata
Madasumma valida
Mnesibulus pallipes
Patiscus quadripunctatus
Pentacentrus pulchellus
Poliotrella greeni
Prozvenella saussureana
Varitrella varipennis

Family:Pyrgomorphidae - Gaudy grasshoppers
Aularches miliaris
 Atractomorpha crenulata
 Chrotogonus oxypterus 
 Orthacris ceylonica 
 Orthacris filiformis

Family:Stenopelmatidae - Jerusalem crickets
 Oryctopus lagenipes

Family:Tettigoniidae - Katydids
Acrodonta subaptera 
Paramorsimus robustus 
Brunneriana ceylonica 
Brunneriana opaca 
Cratioma myops 
Euconocephalus incertus 
Mecopoda elongata 
Pseudophaneroptera turbida 
Vetralla difformis

Sub family:Conocephalinae - Meadow katydids

Ruspolia differens 
Conocephalus maculatus 
Conocephalus signatus

Sub family:Pseudophyllinae - True katydids

Cratioma sp.
Olcinia sp.
Onomarchus cretaceus
Sathrophyllia rugosa
Zabalius aridus

Sub family:Phaneropterinae - Phaneropterine katydids

Deflorita deflorita 
Ducetia ceylanica 
Ducetia japonica 
Elimaea carinata 
Elimaea melanocantha
Elimaea nigrosignata
Himertula marmorata 
Holochlora brevifissa 
Letana inflata 
Molpa bilineolata 
Phaneroptera gracilis 
Pseudophaneroptera turbida

References

 
.Sri Lanka
Orthoptera
Sri Lanka